Flavius Asclepiodotus or Asclepiades (fl. 423–425) was a politician of the Eastern Roman Empire

Asclepiodotus was the brother-in-law of the sophist Leontius, and thus the uncle of Athenais, who in 421 married the Emperor Theodosius II taking the name of Aelia Eudocia. Eudocia favoured her family, exercising her influence over her husband to advance Asclepiodotus' career.

In 422, Asclepiodotus was comes sacrarum largitionum, while between 14 February 423 (the year in which Eudocia was appointed Augusta) to 1 February 425 he was Praetorian prefect of the East, and Consul in 423. He was deposed because he was denounced to Theodosius by Simeon Stylites for encouraging pagans and Jews and undermining Christians, a charge no doubt reinforced by the fact that his family was pagan, although Athenais had to convert to Christianity before marriage.

Bibliography 
 Jones, Arnold Hugh Martin, John Robert Martindale, John Morris, "Asclepiodotus 1", The Prosopography of the Later Roman Empire, volume 1, Cambridge University Press, 1992, p. 160.

5th-century Byzantine people
5th-century Roman consuls
Comites sacrarum largitionum
Imperial Roman consuls
Praetorian prefects of the East